Grindelwald railway station is a railway station in the village and municipality of Grindelwald in the Swiss canton of Bern. The station is the terminus of both the Berner Oberland Bahn (BOB), whose trains operate services to Interlaken Ost, and of the Wengernalpbahn (WAB), whose trains operate to Kleine Scheidegg via Grindelwald Grund.

The BOB and WAB lines use different gauges, and there is no physical connection between them. However the trains operate from adjacent platforms within the same station. Trains of both lines enter the station from its western end. Counter-intuitively, the WAB commences its ascent to Kleine Scheidegg by descending steeply to Grindelwald Grund, where it reverses and commences its climb.

Services 
 the following rail services stop at Grindelwald:

 Regio:

Post bus services connect Grindelwald station to other local places, including a service to Meiringen over the Grosse Scheidegg Pass, using a road closed to most other traffic.

References

External links 
 
 Grindelwald station page on the Jungfraubahnen web site
 

Railway stations in the canton of Bern
Grindelwald
Bernese Oberland Railway stations
Railway stations in Switzerland opened in 1890